Dorothea quarry is a disused slate quarry in the Nantlle Valley area in North Wales. It covers a large area near the village of Talysarn and contains three flooded deep lakes.

History

Turner family 
The quarry commenced working in the early 1820s, though there were a number of smaller workings on or near the site before this. About 1829 it was leased by William Turner who named the workings Cloddfa Turner. In the 1830s the quarry was generating £2000 profits per year. Turner's son took over as manager and renamed the quarry Dorothea, apparently after the wife of the landowner Richard Garnons. Profits began to fall in the 1840s, and in April 1848 the quarry was put up for sale, with 22 years remaining on the lease.

Local ownership 
It was the largest quarry in the area, employing 200 men and producing 5,000-6,000 tons of finished slate a year. A group of quarrymen led by John Robinson, William Owen and John Jones purchased Dorothea from Turner for £3,000 - . They renewed the lease of the quarry in June 1851. The quarry was put up for sale again in 1864, at which time production was given at 1,000 tons per month. No buyer was found, instead John Williams of Denbighshire gradually bought out many of the existing shareholders, and by 1879 he had amassed more than 70% of the shares.

Production peaked in 1872 at 17,442 tons, though 1875 was the most profitable year, generating  £14,738. In the 1930s over 350 men were employed at Dorothea. Production dropped significantly after the start of World War II and the quarry closed in 1970.

After closure 
Since quarrying ended in 1970, the Dorothea quarry has flooded and become a popular site for scuba diving (even though there are no facilities provided, and diving is officially banned in the quarry); the unregulated nature and depth of the site has encouraged some divers to overestimate their capabilities – in the decade 1994–2004, 21 divers lost their lives in the quarry.

Description 

The quarry sits at the bottom of the wide Nantlle valley and consists of six pits, the deepest dropping 106m from the surface. The slate veins here run vertically, allowing unusually deep vertical pits to be dug. Because the pits fall below the water table they needed to be constantly pumped to stay dry. A Cornish beam engine was installed in 1904 to pump the pits; it stayed in use until 1951 when it was replaced with electric pumps. This was the last new Cornish engine to be built. It remains in situ in its Grade I listed engine house.

Transportation 

The quarry was one of the first users of the  Nantlle Railway in 1828. It later developed an extensive internal tramway system of  gauge. Dorothea was one of the first users of De Winton locomotives in 1869.

Locomotives 
 gauge locomotives known to have worked at Dorothea.

References 

Slate mines in Gwynedd
Diving quarries in the United Kingdom
Cornish engines
Preserved beam engines
Llanllyfni
Dyffryn Nantlle